Nicodicodine is an opioid developed as a cough suppressant and analgesic. Synthesized in 1904, it is not commonly used, but has activity similar to other opioids. Nicodicodine is metabolised in the liver by demethylation to produce 6-nicotinoyldihydromorphine, and subsequently further metabolised to dihydromorphine. Since the final active metabolite is the slightly stronger opiate dihydromorphine rather than morphine, nicodicodine can be expected to be marginally more potent and longer acting than nicocodeine. Side effects are similar to those of other opioids and include itching, nausea and respiratory depression.

References

4,5-Epoxymorphinans
Phenol ethers
Nicotinate esters
Mu-opioid receptor agonists
Semisynthetic opioids